Mihrdat V (Latinized as ), of the Chosroid Dynasty, was the king of Iberia (Kartli, eastern Georgia) reigning, according to a medieval Georgian literary tradition, for 12 years, from c. 435 to 447 (according to  Cyril Toumanoff).

Mihrdat was the son and successor of King Archil. The Georgian annals praise Mihrdat for his piety, but provide no details about his reign. He was married to Sagdukht, daughter of Barzabod, Mihranid prince of Gardman, and fathered Vakhtang, his successor.

References

Chosroid kings of Iberia
5th-century monarchs in Asia
Vassal rulers of the Sasanian Empire
Georgians from the Sasanian Empire